Muzyak (Müzäk) is a rural locality (a selo) and the administrative centre of Muzyakovsky Selsoviet, Krasnokamsky District, Bashkortostan, Russia. The population was 544 as of 2010. There are 6 streets.

Geography 
Muzyak is located 21 km northeast of Nikolo-Beryozovka (the district's administrative centre) by road. Murzino is the nearest rural locality.

References 

Rural localities in Krasnokamsky District